PHY-Level Collision Avoidance (PLCA) is a reconciliation sublayer defined within IEEE 802.3 clause 148. PLCA is used in 802.3cg (10Base-T1), which focuses on bringing ethernet connectivity to short-haul embedded internet of things and low throughput, noise-tolerant, industrial deployment use cases.

See also
Internet of things (IOT)

References

Ethernet
Computer networking
Algorithms
Internet of things